Ahmad Ali Hassan (1916–2010), in Arabic أحمد علي حسن, is a Syrian classical poet born in 1916 in Almlaja village in Tartous and died in the morning of 5 July 2010.

Early life 
He Learned to read and write from his father and brother. His family was not able to send him to the official school in Hmmein, entrusted to him attention to the task of herding the small herd of family property.
He felt inside strong tendency towards other interests, so emigrated in 1934 to Tartus as his brothers Abdul Karim and Salman have already done. There he did not success neither in the work of commerce nor in the private schools he worestablish with his brother Abdul Karim.

The first publications 
He wrote his first article and sent it to the Egyptian magazine called "the guidance of Islam," and it was published in 1935, he was only 19 years old at that time.
In 1938, he published his first collection of poetry called "Alzfrat”. He also wrote under the heading "social literary collection of poems". This was one of the pioneers who have devoted a name independent of the divan (collection of poems instead of the label that was prevailing at that time as "person’s name" or "selections").

The main events and activities 
In 1938 he joined the Institute of Islamic religious in Damascus (now the College of Sharia), and did not complete the study because of family circumstances, was married and had fathered.
Out of the prevailing system of nomenclature in the naming, he named his daughters and his sons, accompanied by the change since the late 1930s.

He worked in 1939 as chief editor of the newspaper "Voice of Truth" which was published in Lattakia.
He settled starting from 1948 in his job of Justice continued until his retirement in 1974, turning on the job between Safita, Banias and Tartous. During that period, his name merged in the field of literary and cultural and devotes as one of the important poets of Syrian classical and well known in that period, participating in major poetry festivals were held like “Abu Firas al-Hamdani festival" in Aleppo, and "Sharif Razi festival " in Lattakia
also contributed in the founding of Al Zahra charitable society of and Okaz literary forum in Banias.
He participated in the founding conference of the Arab Writers Union in Damascus and contributed in several conferences. Union also sent him as a part of its cultural delegation to Germany in the early 1970s.
He published several collections of poetry, including: Alzfrat, River of Beam, Dampness and Shades, Luminous Poems, on the Graves of Loved ones, Sababat.

Arguments 
He entered at his early age, and his early cultural and literary life in the dialogue on the pages of some magazines, literary and intellectual with Suhail Idris and also with Albert Doumit. He also rebutted later in separate books on books by other writers such as Abu Musa Al-Hariri and Abdul Hussein Al-Askari.

Other topics of interest 
He was interested in history and thought was of his research and books in this area: "Sufism dialectic and affiliation" which is considered as one of the important researches in this field, as he chronicled to the village of Hmmein, and he searched in an analytical and historical reading, and anthropological approach to the life and travels of poet mystic "Almkazhon Alsnjari" quoted through them, as hypotheses of the research, on whereabouts of the tomb of this poet, where it is a place of disagreement.
In addition to several books included articles in literary criticism, including: Spotlight, Attitudes and Emotions.

Death 

He died Monday morning, the fifth of July in 2010 after living all his lifelong-lasting in the reluctance of worship voluntarily at the altar of the word conscious and meaningful in order to enrich the Arabic library authorship of value and he got what he wanted in the end result of devotion to the message of literature and thought. He is considered as a talented poet and classical imaginative, so he is an Arab-Islamic thinker.

Syrian poets
1916 births
2010 deaths
20th-century poets